White Night is a Canadian anthology film released in 2017. It comprises six stories set during Toronto's Nuit Blanche arts festival. Musical interludes are provided by Stephen Joffe and the indie bands Beams and Birds of Bellwood.

Cast

Reception 
Critical reception to White Night was lukewarm.

Nows Norman Wilner compared the film's style to the works of Richard Linklater, but felt that its editing could have been tighter.

Bruce DeMara of the Toronto Star enjoyed White Nights music and cinematography, though thought that it seemed like "an extended promo" for Nuit Blanche, and at times found it "a bit wearing, just like the real event."

Gayle MacDonald of The Globe and Mail gave it  stars out of 4, praising the performance of Darrell Faria, but writing "the film doesn't quite pull off the challenge of fusing the visions of five filmmakers into one cohesive whole."

References

External links 
 

2017 films
Canadian anthology films
Films shot in Toronto
English-language Canadian films
2010s English-language films
2010s Canadian films